Social War may refer to:

 Social War (357–355 BC), or the War of the Allies, fought between the Second Athenian Empire and the allies of Chios, Rhodes, and Cos as well as Byzantium
 Social War (220–217 BC), fought among the southern Greek states
 Social War (91–87 BC), or the Italian or Marsic War, fought between the Roman Republic and several Italian cities